Presente (English: Present) is the fourth studio album by the Río de la Plata-based music band Bajofondo released on March 5, 2013, through Sony Music. The album was produced by Bajofondo members, Gustavo Santaolalla and Juan Campodónico, and features arrangements by Alejandro Terán.

At the 14th Annual Latin Grammy Awards, the album won Best Instrumental Album and was nominated for Album of the Year, the song "Pena en mi Corazón" won Best  Alternative Song. The album also received a nomination for Best Instrumental/Fusion/World Music Album at the Gardel Awards of 2014 while the song "Lluvia" was nominated for Best Music Video.

Singles
The songs "Pide Piso" and "La Trufa y el Sifón" were released as singles for the album on February 12, 2013, and March 5, 2013, respectively.

Track listing
All tracks are produced by Gustavo Santaolalla and Juan Campodónico and written by Bajofondo (Adrián Sosa, Gabriel Casacuberta, Gustavo Santaolalla, Juan Campodónico, Javier Casalla, Luciano Supervielle, Martín Ferrés, Verónica Loza), except where noted.

Credits and personnel 
Adapted from TIDAL.

Musicians

 Gustavo Santaolalla – production (all tracks), songwriting (all tracks), electric guitar (1, 2, 3, 4, 6, 7, 8, 9, 12, 17, 18, 19, 20, 21), guitar (4, 9, 14), acoustic guitar (5, 6, 13), cymbal (5), keyboards (6), organ (6), tambourine (6), vocals (6, 11, 16, 19), background vocals (12, 14), drums (14)
 Juan Campodónico – production (all tracks), songwriting (all tracks), guitar (2, 3, 4, 8, 14, 17, 18, 19, 20), electric guitar (8), background vocals (12, 16, 19), vocals (14)
 Adrián Sosa – songwriting (all tracks), drums (2, 3, 4, 5, 6, 7, 8, 9, 10, 12, 14, 16, 17, 18, 19, 20), background vocals (6, 16, 19), bass (8), synthesizer (8, 20), acoustic guitar (12), electric guitar (12), vocals (12, 20)
 Gabriel Casacuberta – songwriting (all tracks), bass (2, 3, 4, 5, 9, 13, 17, 18), background vocals (6, 12, 16, 19), bass guitar (16, 19), glockenspiel (19), harp (19), keyboards (19), vocals (20)
 Javier Casalla – songwriting (all tracks), violin (1, 3, 4, 5, 6, 7, 8, 9, 10, 12, 13, 14, 16, 17, 18, 20), guitar (7), drums (13), background vocals (16, 19), vocals (20)
 Luciano Supervielle – songwriting (all tracks), piano (2, 3, 4, 5, 6, 7, 8, 9, 10, 12, 13, 16, 17, 18, 20), background vocals (6, 12, 16, 19), synthesizer (9), vocals (20)
 Martín Ferrés – songwriting (all tracks), bandoneon (1, 3, 4, 5, 6, 7, 8, 9, 10, 12, 13, 14, 15, 17,19, 20), bass (15), guitar (15), background vocals (16, 19), vocals (20)
 Verónica Loza – songwriting (all tracks), background vocals (6, 12, 16)
 Eduardo Rovira – songwriting (2, 3, 10)
 Romeo Gavioli – songwriting (2)
 Atilio Supparo – songwriting (4)
 Salvador Merico – songwriting (4)
 Fernando Santullo – songwriting (14)
 Martín Rivero – songwriting (16)
 Roberto Musso – songwriting (16)
 Enrique Mario Francini – songwriting (18)
 Homero Expósito – songwriting (18)
 Héctor Stamponi – songwriting (18)
 Luis Garutti – songwriting (20)
 Alejandro Terán – arranger (all tracks), conductor (1, 2)
 Aníbal Kerpel – co-production (all tracks), bass (6), synthesizer (6)

Technical

 Aníbal Kerpel – recording engineer (all tracks)
 Jorge Chiccarelli – recording engineer (all tracks)
 Jorge "Portugues" Da Silva – recording engineer (all tracks)
 Julio Berta – recording engineer (all tracks)

References

External links

2013 albums
Bajofondo albums